The Naga Metropolitan Cathedral, formally the Metropolitan Cathedral and Parish of Saint John the Evangelist, is a Roman Catholic cathedral in Naga City, Camarines Sur, Philippines. It is the seat of the Roman Catholic Archdiocese of Caceres. The first church was established after the creation of the archdiocese as the Diocese of Cáceres in 1595. The present cathedral was built in 1808, and was completed and consecrated in 1843.

The Most Rev. Rolando Joven Tria Tirona O.C.D., D.D., is the present Archbishop of Cáceres, while Rev. Msgr. Noe P. Badiola was appointed rector in 2011.

History
The first cathedral built for Naga was founded after the Diocese of Cáceres was established in 1595. It is a suffragan of the Diocese of Manila created by the papal bull of 14 August 1595, which also elevated the Diocese of Manila into an archdiocese. The church was destroyed by fire in 1768.

The construction of the present cathedral in Spanish Romanesque Revival style was begun by Bishop Bernardo dela Concepción O.F.M. in 1808. An earthquake in 1820 damaged the cathedral. It was finished and consecrated under the administration of Monsignor Tomás Ladrón de Guevara in 1843. It was damaged by a typhoon in October 1856, and restored by the Fray Francisco Gainza in 1862–1879. It was damaged by an earthquake in 1887, and repaired by Obras Publicas under the direction of Bishop Arsenio del Campo and Ricardo Ayuso in 1890.

During the episcopate of Leonardo Zamora Legaspi, the cathedral was restored beginning in April 1987 under the supervision of Jaime M. San Andres, parish priest of the Saint John the Evangelist Parish, Naga City. On February 6, 1988, during the feast of Saint Peter Baptist, titular patron of the Archdiocese of Caceres, the metropolitan cathedral was again inaugurated and rededicated by Archbishop Legaspi together with other Bicolano bishops and priests.

Description
The church presently has a generally cruciform plan and is Romanesque in ornamentation. It is a large stone construction with gabled galvanized iron sheets for roofing, the walls outside has a grey color. Above the crossing is a rectangular dome topped by a cupola.

The front façade has a high arch entrance with two-level, twin pilasters flanking both sides. It has a gentle curvature on both front corners to create the illusion of a softened façade. The façade is topped by a pediment surmounted by a round cupola, with its roof supported by tiny columns. The pediment is flanked by two short, symmetric hexagonal belfries on both ends. The front façade has an overall squat look typical of Earthquake Baroque architecture. The front façade also holds the coats of arms of Castile and León, at the front of the entrance.

Inside the cathedral are arcades to counter the effects of earthquakes that damaged the cathedral in 1820; above the nave and both left and right aisles are supported by four massive series of arches and columns. Each of the massive interior columns, arches, including the ceilings are decorated by trompe-l'œil paintings that were recently done. Both sides have stained glass windows.

Gallery

References

External links

Roman Catholic cathedrals in the Philippines
Roman Catholic churches in Camarines Sur
Buildings and structures in Naga, Camarines Sur
Baroque architecture in the Philippines
Spanish Colonial architecture in the Philippines
Tourist attractions in Naga, Camarines Sur
Churches in the Roman Catholic Archdiocese of Caceres